Deng Nan (born October 1945 in Guang'an, Sichuan) is a Chinese politician and physicist.

Early life
Deng was born the second daughter of Deng Xiaoping with his third wife Zhuo Lin.

Deng studied physics at Peking University from 1964 to 1970. During university, she was secretary of the branch Communist Youth League of China. In Spring 1968, Nie Yuanzi directed Red Guards to detain Deng and her elder brother Deng Pufang. They were imprisoned in separate rooms of the physics department in an attempt to force self-criticisms from each. Deng was released relatively soon, whereas her brother was held and tortured for four months.

In 1970, Deng was sent to the Gaozhaizi Commune in present-day Ningqiang County for reeducation. She was assigned to the people's welfare production brigade at Dingjiawan, where she lived with the family of the branch secretary Jiang Yingchang. She participated in constructing terraces, drying cereals, collecting firewood, and other labour. In her first year, Deng was referred to as the most zealous of the intellectual youth sent to Ningqiang County.

Career
She served as vice minister of China's State Science and Technology Commission (1998 - November 2004). She was a member of the 17th Central Committee of the Communist Party of China.

She is considered to be a member of the Crown Prince Party.

Personal life
Deng's university classmate Zhang Hong was sent to the same commune in Ningqiang County, where the two frequently cooked food and collected firewood together. They are thought to have already been romantically involved at this point. The two later had a daughter in 1972 called Deng Zhuorui, alternatively known as Mianmian. Zhuorui married the CEO of Anbang Insurance Group, Wu Xiaohui in 2004. It was Wu's third marriage and they had one son. In 2014, Zhuorui ceased being a shareholder in two companies owned by Anbang, which was followed by news of the couple's separation in 2015.

References

Notes

Works Cited

1945 births
Living people
Politicians from Guang'an
Deng Xiaoping family
People's Republic of China politicians from Sichuan
Chinese Communist Party politicians from Sichuan
21st-century Chinese women politicians
21st-century Chinese politicians